Balkan is the second studio album by Bosnian-Serbian pop-folk recording artist Seka Aleksić. It was released 1 December 2003 through the record label Grand Production

Track listing
Crno i zlatno (Black and Gold)
Ne ostavljaj me samu (Do Not Leave Me Alone)
Oči plave boje (Blue Eyes)
K'o da sutra ne postoji (As If Tomorrow Doesn't Exist)
Jedna više (One More)
Idi lepi moj (Go, My Lovely)
Balkan
Šta je bilo, bilo je (What Happened, Happened)
Dan od života (A Day of Life)
Dim srca mog (Smoke of my Heart)

References

2003 albums
Seka Aleksić albums
Grand Production albums